SM UB-85 was a Type UB III U-boat in the German Imperial Navy during World War I. Ordered on 23 September 1916, the U-boat was built at the AG Weser shipyard in Bremen and commissioned on 24 November 1917, under the command of Kapitänleutnant Günther Krech.

Construction

SM UB-85 was built by AG Weser of Bremen and following just under a year of construction, launched at Bremen on 26 October 1917, and was commissioned later that same year. Like all Type UB III submarines, UB-85 carried 10 torpedoes and was armed with a  deck gun. UB-85 had a displacement of  while surfaced and  when submerged. Her engines enabled her to travel at  when surfaced and  when submerged.

Service history
On her second patrol, she was picked up by HM Drifter Coreopsis II off the coast of Belfast, Ireland on 30 April 1918, after she was partially flooded through a semi-open hatch while trying to evade attack by the British vessel. The ingress of water could not be controlled, since cables for a heater in the officers' compartment had previously been laid through a watertight door, by order of Kapt. Krech. The submarine was forced to surface and was abandoned by her crew while under fire. No casualties occurred amongst the 34 crew and they were taken as prisoners of war.

Relationship with cryptozoology

Under interrogation, the captain is reported to have said that the submarine had surfaced the night before to recharge the batteries and had been attacked by a large sea creature that had damaged the vessel and left it unable to submerge. The crew had fired their sidearms at the creature. British nautical archaeologist and historian, Dr Innes McCartney, Research Fellow at Bournemouth University, has been unable to find any source for the story before its first appearance on the internet in 2005.

Wreck

Dr Innes McCartney who identified the wreck said: "We are certainly closer to solving the so-called mystery of UB-85 and the reason behind its sinking - whether common mechanical failure or something that is less easily explained."

See also
SM U-28 (Germany)

References

Notes

Bibliography

External links
 

1917 ships
German Type UB III submarines
U-boats commissioned in 1917
Maritime incidents in 1918
U-boats sunk in 1918
World War I submarines of Germany
World War I shipwrecks in the Irish Sea
Ships built in Bremen (state)
U-boats sunk by British warships